Hypnotica may refer to:

Hypnotica (medicine)
Hypnotica (Benny Benassi album), 2003
Hypnotica, album by former Black Sabbath singer Tony Martin and Empire (band) 2001